William Finbar Gillingham (born 7 October 1998) is an English footballer who currently plays as a defender.

Career

Youth and college
Gillingham was born in London, England, but was raised in Auckland, New Zealand. He attended Sacred Heart College, Auckland, leading the Sharks to a National Championship in 2014 and 2016 and a runner-up finish in 2015. He also played with the Onehunga Sports U19 side.

In 2017, Gillingham moved to the United States to play college soccer at the University of California, Santa Barbara. In four seasons with the Gauchos, Gillingham went on to make 66 appearances, scoring one goal and tallying three assists, whilst captaining the side in their 2020–21 season.

Gillingham also competed in the USL League Two in 2021, playing twelve times for South Georgia Tormenta 2.

Central Valley Fuego
On 17 February 2022, Gillingham signed with USL League One expansion club Central Valley Fuego FC ahead of their inaugural season. He made his competitive debut for the club in its opening match of the season, appearing as an injury-time substitute during a 2–0 victory over the Greenville Triumph.

International
Gillingham was on the New Zealand U23 Olympic squad's long list in 2019, but hasn't represented the OlyWhites at any level.

References

External links

1998 births
Living people
Association football defenders
Central Valley Fuego FC players
English footballers
English expatriate footballers
English expatriate sportspeople in the United States
Expatriate soccer players in the United States
Footballers from Greater London
New Zealand association footballers
New Zealand expatriate association footballers
New Zealand expatriate sportspeople in the United States
Tormenta FC 2 players
UC Santa Barbara Gauchos men's soccer players
USL League One players
USL League Two players
People educated at Sacred Heart College, Auckland